Simpson College is a private Methodist liberal arts college in Indianola, Iowa. It is accredited by the Higher Learning Commission and has about 1,250 full-time and 300 part-time students. In addition to the Indianola residential campus, Simpson has a facility in West Des Moines.

Simpson is known for its commitment to civic engagement and non-partisan education on public issues, exemplified by the John C. Culver Public Policy Center and by its two Pi Kappa Delta debate national championships from 2016 and 2018.

Simpson College is #1 among Iowa private colleges and #7 overall in the newly released U.S. News & World Report's 2022-23 Midwest Regional Rankings. Simpson's Midwest honors also included a #4 ranking among “Best Value Schools” and #6 for “Best Undergraduate Teaching.”

History 

Indianola Male and Female Seminary was opened September 24, 1860, and the name was changed to the Des Moines Conference Seminary in September 1865. On September 21, 1867, the school was upgraded to a college, and renamed Simpson Centenary College to honor Methodism's most renowned living bishop, Bishop Matthew Simpson (1811-1884) and to celebrate the centennial of American Methodism. (Simpson is best known as the minister who spoke a eulogy at Abraham Lincoln's funeral in Springfield, Illinois, in 1865; he was known as a great pulpit preacher.) Simpson himself gave the commencement address at Simpson in 1882. In June 1885, "Centenary" was dropped from the name, becoming simply Simpson College.

September 28, 2010, marked the 150th anniversary of the school's founding as an educational institution. To celebrate the event, students and alumni held a ceremony in front of the college gates, where a time capsule was buried with pictures and memorabilia submitted by students. The capsule will be uncovered in 2060, on Simpson's 200th anniversary.

Presidents
 Marsha Kelliher (2020–present)
 Jay Simmons (2013-2019)
 John Byrd (2005-2013)
 Kevin LaGree (1999-2005)
 Stephen G. Jennings (1987-1998)
 Robert Edward McBride (1979-1987)
 Richard Bailey Lancaster (1972-1979)
 Ralph Candler John (1963-1972)
 William Edward Kerstetter (1953-1963)
 Edwin Edgar Voigt (1942-1952)
 Earl Enyeart Harper (1936-1938)
 John Linnaeus Hillman (1919-1936)
 James Watson Campbell (1916-1919)
 William Ennis Hamilton (1915-1916)
 Charles Eldred Shelton (1899-1910)
 Joseph Benton Harris (1898-1899)
 Another Simpson (1892-1898)
 Edmund Meek Holmes (1889-1892)
 William Ennis Hamilton (1886-1889)
 Edward Lamay Parks (1880-1886)
 Thomas S. Berry (1878-1880)
 Alexander Burns (1868-1878)
 Samuel Milton Vernon (1866-1868)

Campus 

The  tree-lined campus is bordered on the north by Buxton Park Arboretum. The architecture blends tradition with modernity. The theater building, an example of the Brutalist architecture that dominated American campus construction in the 1970s, was renovated and added on to in 2010–11, softening its features.

Other notable construction includes the Kent Family Campus center, which replaced the old Brenton Student Center as the center of student life. The 55,000-square-foot campus center houses meeting rooms and offices for student groups, a student activities theatre, comfortable living room settings, a grille and snack bar, a coffee house, a new bookstore and post office, and new professional space for the Student Development staff.

Simpson also renovated its outdoor track and football field. In addition to rebuilding the entrances and fences surrounding Bill Buxton stadium, the school invested in what has been dubbed the most innovative artificial turf system in the world, FieldTurf Revolution. The new-era Beynon BSS 1000 running track, similar to the new tracks installed at the University of Virginia and The University of Iowa, was also installed for the 2011–12 school year. The renovation of Simpson's athletic facilities concluded in 2014 with the construction of a new bi-level weight room in the former pool area. This move was made possible by the construction of the Indianola YMCA, which has a 25-yard pool and hosts swimming meets for Simpson College, Indianola High School, and the YMCA Tide swim team.

Simpson offers a variety of residential housing options, including two first year-only residence halls, other traditional residence halls, apartment-style living, theme houses and an active Greek system. All Simpson living facilities include air conditioning, lofted beds, carpet, furniture, social lounges and wireless internet.

Organization and administration
The college had an endowment of $78.6 million as of February 10, 2017.

Academics 
Simpson's curriculum includes more than 70 majors, minors, and pre-professional programs. Coursework is structured in a 4-4-1 format, with classes running September–December and January–April before the three-week May Term. This provides students with many unique learning opportunities, including internship programs, career observations and a variety of Study Abroad programs that take place over May Term.

Beginning in Fall 2011, most courses at Simpson are four-credit courses. Simpson also implemented their new Engaged Citizenship Curriculum, which is largely based on the AAC&U Liberal Education and America's Promise (LEAP) initiative. The new curriculum attempts to build seven different Embedded Skills into all courses. The seven skills are:
Collaborative leadership
Critical thinking
Information literacy
Intercultural communication
Oral communication
Quantitative reasoning
Written communication

In addition to classes in their major, students are required to take courses in seven specified Areas of Engagement:
The Arts
Civic Engagement
Diversity and Power in the United States
Ethics and Values Inquiry
Global Perspectives
Historical Perspectives on Western Culture
Scientific Reasoning

In order to meet the global perspectives Area of Engagement, many students will take an overseas course, which may be completed throughout an entire semester (with exchange programs in London, Germany, Chile, Thailand, and Tahiti) or over May Term, which provides different selections every year. Some of the recent May Term travel courses include trips to China, Thailand, Italy, London, Paris, Ghana, Belize, and the Netherlands. Simpson ranks among the nation's top 100 colleges in the percentage of students who study abroad, according to U.S. News & World Report.

In addition to these requirements, students also take two courses to bookend their Simpson Experience: the Simpson Colloquium and the Senior Capstone. The Simpson Colloquium is taken during the first semester of college and is designed to help students make the transition to college life. The Senior Capstone is a culminating project in each student's major demonstrating their proficiency in a chosen field of study.

Music
Simpson is notable for being the only college in the United States with an entirely student-cast undergraduate opera program that is supported by a largely professional orchestra. Two fully staged productions a year with admission open to the public and free to all students are staples of the Simpson calendar. Alumni can be found at the highest levels in opera performance, artistic administration, and music education.

Music at Simpson has been fully accredited by the National Association of Schools of Music since 1947, and confers the degrees of Bachelor of Music in performance and in music education, and the Bachelor of Arts in music. It is widely recognized as offering a premier education for vocal, piano, and instrumental students. Simpson develops the unique gifts of each student through a combination of one-to-one music instruction, classroom teaching, and countless performance opportunities. Aspects of the program have been cited as "outstanding" by U.S. News & World Report and the program in voice as "exceptional" by the National Association of Teachers of Singing.

Simpson College enjoys a historic close partnership with the Des Moines Metro Opera, which makes it home on the Simpson campus over the summer, with performances in Simpson's Blank Performing Arts Center. It provides Simpson students with the invaluable opportunity to experience professional opera on their doorstep, and to serve as interns and production staff in the summer opera festival. Many singers from Simpson have taken part in the DMMO Apprenticeship Program, an opportunity afforded usually to only the most talented graduate students and young professional singers from all over the United States.

Speech and debate
Simpson runs a comprehensive program where students discover which style of speech or debate event offered best aligns with their long-term goals. The team competes in Public Forum, Parliamentary (NPDA & PLUM), International Public Debate (IPDA), NFA Lincoln-Douglas, Student Congress, and a wide variety of speech events. It is coached by Spencer Waugh.

The team has won the Phi Kappa Delta Debate Championship four times: 2016, 2018, 2019, and 2021.

Athletics
Simpson College athletic teams are nicknamed the Storm.  They compete in the American Rivers Conference in NCAA Division III.  Simpson fields men's teams in baseball, basketball, cross country, American football, golf, soccer, tennis, track & field, and wrestling.  Women's teams include: basketball, cross country, golf, soccer, softball, swimming, tennis, track & field, and volleyball.  Simpson also fields cheerleading and dance squads.

Simpson College has appeared in the NCAA tournament many times:

Baseball appearances: 1990, 1991, 1992, 1994, 1999, 2004
Men's Basketball appearances: 1976, 1992, 1995, 1996
Men's Basketball NAIA appearances: 1938, 1939, 1940, 1941, 1942, 1943, 1945, 1961
Women's Basketball appearances: 1983, 1985, 1999, 2000, 2005, 2006, 2007, 2008, 2009, 2010, 2011
Men's Cross Country appearances: 1986
Women's Cross Country appearances: 1990
Football appearances: 1988, 1989, 1991, 1996, 1997, 2003
Women's Golf appearances: 1991, 1992, 1993, 1994, 1996, 1997, 1998, 1999, 2002, 2006
Men's Soccer appearances: 2000
Women's Soccer appearances: 1999
Softball appearances: 1989, 1990, 1991, 1992, 1994, 1995, 1996, 1997, 1998, 1999, 2000, 2006, 2008, 2010
Volleyball appearances: 1991, 1992, 1994, 1997, 2006, 2008, 2009

The Storm has achieved the honor of being Regional Champions also:
Baseball: 1991
Football: 1997
Softball:  1996, 1997, 1998, 1999

The Simpson College softball team won the NCAA Division III National Championship in 1997 and 1999. Simpson's softball team appeared in one Women's College World Series in 1971.

Gold Club 
The Gold Club is a non-profit organization founded in 1976, funded by the Indianola community and Simpson alumni that helps support Simpson College athletics. Gold Club members are former athletes, alumni, faculty, parents, and other athletic supporters who share the common interest of fostering the development and growth of Simpson College athletics.

Student life
The Simpsonian  is the student newspaper. The newspaper has been published since September 1870. It provides formal practical experience for students interested in journalism and serves as a forum for student opinions and ideas.

Sequel is an annual Simpson literary arts magazine, assembled from student and faculty contributions including paintings, photographs, drawings, short fiction, and short non-fiction.

KSTM, 88.9, is the student-operated campus radio station. It has limited wattage and the signal does not really carry outside of Warren County.

Intramurals allow students, faculty, and staff to become involved in recreational activities. The campus community is invited to participate, and participants may do as many activities as they wish. Over 60% of the campus participates in one or more of the programs offered through the Office of Intramurals and Recreation. Events are widely varied and skill or expertise is not a requirement when participating in events. The goal is to participate and have fun.

The Campus Activities Board (CAB) is one of the main programming organizations on campus.

Simpson Forum
Throughout the school year, Simpson holds numerous forum events. These are events that are meant to extend a student's education beyond the classroom and allow for personal growth. These events include Simpson-produced arts events, faculty-organized discussions, research symposiums, and expert speakers from outside of Simpson who discuss a wide range of topics. Recent experts include Gabriel Ajak, one of the Lost Boys of Sudan, former U.S. Senator John Culver, and former U.S. Senator and presidential nominee George McGovern among others. Forum events are a requirement for first-year students, as they must attend at least four events throughout the fall semester, but are optional beyond that. Simpson also offers an additional credit to students who attend at least 90% of designated forum events in a semester.

John C. Culver Public Policy Center
The Culver Center was established at Simpson College in 2010 to honor the service of John Culver, who served the people of Iowa for 16 years in the US House of Representatives and US Senate.  The Culver Center is dedicated to encouraging civic engagement and public service.  The program awards four-year scholarships to up to select incoming Simpson students who demonstrate a commitment to public service and civic engagement. The annual John C. Culver Lecture brings a prominent figure in public service or politics to campus to meet with students and deliver a lecture, which is open to the public.  Lectures have included Senator George McGovern, Political Journalist Mark Shields, Supreme Court Reporter Linda Greenhouse, and former Secretary of Defense Chuck Hagel.

Campus Day
Campus Day has been an annual tradition at Simpson College since at least 1911. The idea was conceived by the student body to suspend classes on one Tuesday of the year and put in a day of cleaning campus buildings and grounds. Faculty did not know until they arrived at campus to start classes, but were glad to pitch in. The cleanup of campus became an annual tradition and eventually expanded to the Indianola community. Today, nearly 60% of Simpson students take part in campus day activities, which include campus-assigned projects, a grill out, and a late night dodgeball tournament. Historically, Campus Day was picked early in the year by the student government and reserved as a surprise to the rest of the student body, but today it is announced ahead of time so that students can plan ahead for it.

Greek life
Simpson College has a deep-rooted Greek life history. It is home to eight Greek organizations: three national fraternities; Sigma Alpha Epsilon, Alpha Tau Omega, 
Lambda Chi Alpha, one local fraternity; Kappa Theta Psi, and four national sororities; Kappa Kappa Gamma, Pi Beta Phi, Delta Delta Delta, and Sigma Lambda Gamma. Every April, one week is set aside in the Greek community for Greek Week, a series of coed competitions that instill a sense of unity among the houses, while providing friendly competitiveness.
 Alpha Tau Omega (ATO) is the oldest fraternity on campus, tracing its history at Simpson back to 1885. The fraternity is known nationally as the "leadership development fraternity". After briefly being shut down along with 3 other fraternities on campus in the 1890s, ATO was rechartered in 1905 and has been in continuous existence ever since. The Simpson College ATO chapter has produced many prominent names at the school. Nick Ackerman, the wrestler who won the Division III national championship despite having no legs, was an ATO, as were some of the most prominent names at Simpson College, including Bill Buxton, Bill Buxton, Jr., Dick Buxton, and James Weinman, all of whom have facilities on campus named in their honor. In Oct. 2010, ATO celebrated its 125th year on campus. 
 Sigma Alpha Epsilon (SAE), founded in 1889, is the second oldest fraternity on campus. It is currently the largest fraternity on campus in terms of members. The men of SAE pride themselves on "The True Gentlemen". They are proud to have removed pledging from their fraternity nationally and focus their specific chapter's activities on scholarship and community service. The Iowa Sigma Chapter as it is designated within the national fraternity is one of the oldest chapters of Sigma Alpha Epsilon within the realm. The chapter has recently won awards in their national fraternity for academic excellence, excellence in service, and the coveted national chapter achievement award. In addition, for over 50 years Iowa Sigma was advised by the national fraternities historian Dr. Joseph Walt, for whom the SAE national archives are named for. As such Iowa Sigma is a well recognized and famous chapter within the national fraternity and the men of the chapter have always upheld the highest values of integrity in accordance with the fraternities rich history.  In 2017 Iowa Sigma was awarded the Sigma Alpha Epsilon John O. Moseley Fraternity Zeal Award for the most outstanding SAE chapter in the nation.
 Kappa Theta Psi (KOY) is the oldest local fraternity west of the Mississippi. It was founded in 1902, shortly after a time when four other fraternities on campus (including ATO and SAE) had been shut down due to anti-Greek sentiment. After the quest for a national re-charter from SAE failed, KOY existed for many years as only a local fraternity. After the chapter was nationally chartered in 1969 as an Upsilon Delta chapter, then subsequently shut down by nationals and by Simpson college, KOY returned to campus in 1979. The fraternity saw much success in the 1980s and 1990s, but membership died off in the 2000s and KOY was removed from their house on fraternity row. They were given a house on D Street, a couple of blocks from fraternity row, and were the only fraternity on campus not located on fraternity row. However, thanks to membership growth by the fraternity and meeting standards set by Simpson College, KOY  returned to their former residence on fraternity row (formerly Worth Hall) in 2010.
 Lambda Chi Alpha (LXA) traces its roots at Simpson to 1924 where it existed as the national fraternity Theta Kappa Nu, which merged with Lambda Chi Alpha in 1939.  Recently, Lambda Chi has become known on campus for having many members involved in Political Science, History and the college's nationally recognized speech and debate team. LXA is one of the leading fraternities on Simpson campus for scholastic achievement and dedication to community service.
 Pi Beta Phi (Pi Phi) is Simpson's oldest Greek organization. Pi Phi has been at Simpson since 1874.
 Kappa Kappa Gamma (KKG) was on Simpson's campus for nine years between 1880 and 1889. After a 100-year absence, it was re-established in 1989.
 Delta Delta Delta (DDD or Tri-Delta) has been at Simpson since 1889 and is the longest-running Tri-Delta chapter nationally and internationally.
 Sigma Lambda Gamma (SLG) was established on campus as a national multicultural sorority in 2016.
 Alpha Chi Omega (AXO) had a Simpson College chapter for over 100 years, before it closed its doors in the spring of 2007.

Notable people 

 Simpson College was the first college attended by George Washington Carver. Carver entered Simpson as an art major, but became interested in the natural sciences after receiving advice from a fellow student.  Carver once remarked that his time at Simpson taught him that he was "a human being." Carver left Simpson College to complete his undergraduate education at Iowa State College (now Iowa State University).  Both schools have buildings named in his honor Carver Science Hall, at Simpson, and Carver Hall, at Iowa State University.
 Historian Avery Craven (1885-1980), who specialized in the study of the nineteenth-century United States and the American Civil War, received his B.A. from Simpson in 1908.  The Avery O. Craven Room of Dunn Library at Simpson holds Craven's personal library of over 2,000 volumes, notes, manuscripts, correspondence, and memorabilia.
 Nick Ackerman attended Simpson College in the late 1990s and early 2000s. His wrestling performance in which he won the 2001 NCAA Division III Championships was named as one of the top 25 moments in NCAA history.  Nick lost his legs to bacterial meningitis as a baby but this did not hold him back.
 Former Chicago Alderman, 52nd Mayor of Chicago, and current Cook County Clerk David Orr also attended Simpson College for his undergraduate degree. Orr is an American Democratic Politician from Chicago, Illinois. He was Alderman of the 49th Ward in Chicago from 1979 to 1991. In 1987, he served briefly as Mayor of Chicago after the death of Mayor Harold Washington and was recognized for his strong and sensible leadership during one of the most tumultuous periods in Chicago's political history. Serving his 23rd year as the Clerk of Cook County, Orr is responsible for the third largest election district in the United States (among other duties).
 Mike Pearson, host of Market to Market on Iowa Public Television, is a graduate of the class of 2010.
 Ruth Hinshaw Spray (1848-1929), peace activist
 Evan Tanner (attended), retired professional MMA fighter, former UFC middleweight champion.
 Malcolm A. Love (1904–1990), former President of the University of Nevada (1950–51) and San Diego State University (1952-71). President Love was a graduate of the class of 1927.
 Nate Boulton, received his BA in Political Science and History from Simpson College and is an Iowa state senator and former Iowa Democratic gubernatorial candidate.
 Alice Bellvadore Sams Turner (1859–1915), physician, writer
 Chad Buchanan, 1995 graduate, General Manager of the Indiana Pacers of the National Basketball Association.

References

External links

 
 Simpson College athletics website

 
Buildings and structures in Warren County, Iowa
Educational institutions established in 1860
Education in Warren County, Iowa
Indianola, Iowa
Liberal arts colleges in Iowa
1860 establishments in Iowa
Private universities and colleges in Iowa